Dasypyrum villosum is a species of annual grass in the family Poaceae. It is native to eastern and southern Europe  and Western Asia from the Balearic Islands to Turkmenistan, including in the Mediterranean and the Caucasus regions.

Description
Culms are decumbent, with heights ranging from 25 to 70 cm. Racemes are single, oblong, bilateral, and 4–10 cm long; spikelets are oblong, laterally compressed, and 7–20 mm long.

Stem rust resistance
D. villosum has almost total immunity against Puccinia graminis f. sp. tritici and carries Sr52 which offers some resistance against the Ug99 subrace of P.g.f.sp.t.. The genetic basis for this immunity is being introgressed into its close relative, wheat, which is suffering from new races of this disease.

References

External links 

 Grassbase - The World Online Grass Flora: Dasypyrum villosum
 GBIF entry for Dasypyrum villosum
 USDA Plants Profile for Dasypyrum villosum

Pooideae
Grasses of Asia
Grasses of Europe
Flora of Central Asia
Flora of Eastern Europe
Flora of Southeastern Europe
Flora of Southwestern Europe
Flora of Western Asia
Flora of the Caucasus
Plants described in 1753
Taxa named by Carl Linnaeus